Password is a 2019 Nepali film, directed by Samrat Basnet. The film is written by Bikram Joshi and produced by Amit Basnet, and Hiral Joshi under the banner of AB International. The film stars Anoop Bikram Shahi, Bikram Joshi, Buddhi Tamang, Rabindra Jha, Chhulthim Dolma Gurung, Prabin Khatioda, Dhiren Shakya. The film generally received mixed feedback from the critics.

Plot 

Hit movie

Cast 

 Anoop Bikram Shahi 
 Bikram Joshi
 Buddhi Tamang
 Rabindra Jha
 Chhulthim Dolma Gurung
 Prabin Khatioda
 Dhiren Shakya
 Sunny Leone in an item number "Aajako"

Soundtrack

Release 
Diwakar Pyakurel of Onlinekhabar wrote, "thanks to mediocre cinematography, the movie is unlikely to stand out". Sunny Mahat of The Annapurna Express wrote, "Password is an entirely unintelligent production that is made with a big budget but bad skills".

References

External links 

 
Nepalese crime films
2010s Nepali-language films